Nathan Gordon Brown (born 10 February 1978) is a radio and television football commentator and a former Australian rules footballer for Richmond and the Western Bulldogs in the AFL. He played a total of 219 senior AFL matches and kicked 349 goals. His playing career ended after Richmond told him at the end of 2009 that he would no longer be required as a player.

Recruited from Golden Square and then the Bendigo Pioneers in the TAC Cup to the Western Bulldogs in the AFL, Brown made a name for himself as a dangerous medium-sized forward.

He played with the Bulldogs from 1997 to 2003, and left the club after a more lucrative contract was offered by Richmond. At the time the Western Bulldogs had asked many of their high profile players to take pay cuts to support the team financially.

Richmond playing career
Having been part of the Western Bulldogs side that took out the wooden spoon in 2003, Brown's first season at Richmond did not see any improvement, as the Tigers went on to finish last in 2004 after losing their final fourteen games of the season.

In 2005, Brown continued to perform for the Tigers, partly due to his former coach at the Western Bulldogs, Terry Wallace taking over, and put in a string of match-winning performances in the early part of the season, including a sensational last-quarter burst against Collingwood in Round 8. In this game, Richmond turned a 10-point deficit into a 35-point victory, thanks to Brown's 5 last-quarter goals. The following week against Brisbane, Brown added 4 goals to be one of the match winners along with Shane Tuck. By this point, Richmond were firmly entrenched in the top four with a 7–2 win–loss record, and Brown had kicked 32 goals.

However, in Round 10 against , Brown broke his leg attempting a left-foot kick as Melbourne defender Matthew Whelan dived across him in a legitimate attempt to smother the ball. Brown's right foot became stuck on the Telstra Dome surface and tilted a bit to the right. The injury even sickened media personality Robert Walls, who was watching the match on television, to the extent that he had to turn off his television. Richmond lost the game by 57 points, and would only record three more wins thereafter to finish in 12th place on the ladder.

Brown had a titanium rod inserted into his tibia, and underwent extensive therapy and rehabilitation training over the following pre-season. Despite this, Brown would suffer further complications from his broken leg, among other injuries, eventually leading to his retirement at the end of the 2009 season.

In 2007, with Richmond languishing at the bottom of the ladder, Brown did not play a match at senior level until Round 12, when Richmond defeated Melbourne by 49 points for its first win of the season, with Brown kicking three goals.

Brown played his 200th game against  at Telstra Dome in Round 12, 2008. Richmond won this match by 22 points.

Retirement
In November 2009, Brown announced his retirement from the AFL. He stated that there was interest from other clubs to pick him up, although he believed a persistent groin injury would not stand up to another season of AFL football.

Post AFL Career
In 2013, Brown made a one-off guest appearance for the North Launceston Football Club in the TSL.

Statistics

|-
|- style="background-color: #EAEAEA"
! scope="row" style="text-align:center" | 1997
|style="text-align:center;"|
| 17 || 14 || 10 || 11 || 107 || 35 || 142 || 34 || 7 || 0.7 || 0.8 || 7.6 || 2.5 || 10.1 || 2.4 || 0.5 || 3
|-
! scope="row" style="text-align:center" | 1998
|style="text-align:center;"|
| 17 || 12 || 6 || 5 || 120 || 68 || 188 || 38 || 8 || 0.5 || 0.4 || 10.0 || 5.7 || 15.7 || 3.2 || 0.7 || 2
|- style="background-color: #EAEAEA"
! scope="row" style="text-align:center" | 1999
|style="text-align:center;"|
| 17 || 22 || 19 || 14 || 225 || 110 || 335 || 81 || 17 || 0.9 || 0.6 || 10.2 || 5.0 || 15.2 || 3.7 || 0.8 || 7
|-
! scope="row" style="text-align:center" | 2000
|style="text-align:center;"|
| 17 || 23 || 26 || 13 || 332 || 210 || 542 || 128 || 22 || 1.1 || 0.6 || 14.4 || 9.1 || 23.6 || 5.6 || 1.0 || 2
|- style="background-color: #EAEAEA"
! scope="row" style="text-align:center" | 2001
|style="text-align:center;"|
| 17 || 22 || 32 || 29 || 318 || 147 || 465 || 117 || 30 || 1.5 || 1.3 || 14.5 || 6.7 || 21.1 || 5.3 || 1.4 || 7
|-
! scope="row" style="text-align:center" | 2002
|style="text-align:center;"|
| 17 || 22 || 57 || 24 || 289 || 110 || 399 || 123 || 21 || 2.6 || 1.1 || 13.1 || 5.0 || 18.1 || 5.6 || 1.0 || 13
|- style="background-color: #EAEAEA"
! scope="row" style="text-align:center" | 2003
|style="text-align:center;"|
| 17 || 22 || 56 || 51 || 245 || 88 || 333 || 122 || 29 || 2.5 || 2.3 || 11.1 || 4.0 || 15.1 || 5.5 || 1.3 || 5
|-
! scope="row" style="text-align:center" | 2004
|style="text-align:center;"|
| 7 || 20 || 26 || 28 || 341 || 126 || 467 || 93 || 40 || 1.3 || 1.4 || 17.1 || 6.3 || 23.4 || 4.7 || 2.0 || 8
|- style="background-color: #EAEAEA"
! scope="row" style="text-align:center" | 2005
|style="text-align:center;"|
| 7 || 10 || 34 || 19 || 149 || 53 || 202 || 66 || 10 || 3.4 || 1.9 || 14.9 || 5.3 || 20.2 || 6.6 || 1.0 || 7
|-
! scope="row" style="text-align:center;" | 2006
|style="text-align:center;"|
| 7 || 10 || 11 || 17 || 93 || 28 || 121 || 53 || 9 || 1.1 || 1.7 || 9.3 || 2.8 || 12.1 || 5.3 || 0.9 || 0
|- style="background-color: #EAEAEA"
! scope="row" style="text-align:center;" | 2007
|style="text-align:center;"|
| 7 || 11 || 21 || 14 || 131 || 43 || 174 || 70 || 21 || 1.9 || 1.3 || 11.9 || 3.9 || 15.8 || 6.4 || 1.9 || 0
|-
! scope="row" style="text-align:center;" | 2008
|style="text-align:center;"|
| 7 || 18 || 35 || 21 || 249 || 119 || 368 || 111 || 31 || 1.9 || 1.2 || 13.8 || 6.6 || 20.4 || 6.2 || 1.7 || 3
|- style="background-color: #EAEAEA"
! scope="row" style="text-align:center" | 2009
|style="text-align:center;"|
| 7 || 13 || 16 || 11 || 148 || 84 || 232 || 62 || 24 || 1.2 || 0.8 || 11.4 || 6.5 || 17.8 || 4.8 || 1.8 || 0
|- class="sortbottom"
! colspan=3| Career
! 219
! 349
! 257
! 2747
! 1221
! 3968
! 1098
! 269
! 1.6
! 1.2
! 12.5
! 5.6
! 18.1
! 5.0
! 1.2
! 57
|}

Media career
In 2010, Brown joined The Sunday Footy Show as a regular panellist.
Up until 2014, Brown worked for Triple M as an expert commentator for Saturday night matches alongside Barry Denner, Mark Howard and Ash Chua. He rejoined the station in 2016 as a Friday night commentator and calling one of the Saturday games.

In 2014, Brown joined rival radio station 3AW as a ball-by-ball commentator for Saturday night and Sunday twilight matches.

In October 2014, Brown was appointed sport presenter on Weekend Today replacing Tim Gilbert.

Brown is a brand ambassador for Sportsbet, appearing regularly in the media to cover AFL odds.

Personal life
Brown is married to Kristine Fabiyanic and they have three daughters and a son.

Achievements and honours
 Morrish Medal winner 1996
 All-Australian 2001, 2002
 International Rules Series 2000, 2002, 2003, 2004 (Jim Stynes Medal 2004)
 100 Tiger Treasures "Goal of the Century" Nominee (2008)

References

External links

Nathan Brown profile on the Official AFL Website of the Richmond Football Club

 

1978 births
Living people
Western Bulldogs players
Richmond Football Club players
All-Australians (AFL)
Australian rules footballers from Victoria (Australia)
Bendigo Pioneers players
Golden Square Football Club players
North Launceston Football Club players
Australia international rules football team players